Condena may refer to:

"Condena", song by José Manuel Calderón (musician) 1962
"Condena", song by Maluma from F.A.M.E. (Maluma album) 2018